Horseshoe Bay is a hamlet in the Canadian province of Saskatchewan.

Demographics 

References

Designated places in Saskatchewan
Organized hamlets in Saskatchewan
Parkdale No. 498, Saskatchewan
Division No. 17, Saskatchewan